Talheim is a municipality in the district of Heilbronn in Baden-Württemberg in southern Germany. It is commonly known for its wine, the tennis tournament Heilbronn Open in its industrial park, and, additionally, for the Death Pit discovered in 1983.

References

Heilbronn (district)
6th-century establishments in Germany
Populated places on the Neckar basin
Populated riverside places in Germany